Stauffersberg is a mountain of Bavaria, Germany.

Hills of Bavaria